Country Sunshine is the fourth album by American singer/songwriter Bruce Robison. It was released in 2001 on Boar's Nest Records.

Track listing
 1. Can't Get There From Here - 4:04 (co-write with Allison Moorer)
 2. Bed of Ashes - 3:25
 3. Blame It on Me - 3:48
 4. Devil May Care - 3:14
 5. Valentine - 4:20
 6. Friendless Marriage - 3:48
 7. What Would Willie Do - 5:14
 8. The First Thing About Mary - 3:47
 9. Sixteen - 3:27
 10. Anyone But Me - 3:13
 11. Tonight - 3:34

Personnel
Dennis Crouch - bass guitar
Dan Dugmore - banjo, dobro, acoustic guitar, electric guitar, steel guitar, mandolin
Kenny Malone - drums, percussion
Ian McLagan - Hammond organ
Mickey Raphael - harmonica
Bruce Robison - lead vocals
Pete Wasner - piano, electric piano
Kelly Willis - background vocals

Releases

References

External links 
Bruce Robison website

Bruce Robison albums
2001 albums